Mališauskas is a Lithuanian-language variant of the Polish surname Maliszewski. It may be transliterated into English as Malishauskas.

Notable people with this surname include:

Vidmantas Mališauskas (born 1963),  Lithuanian chess Grandmaster
Henrikas Mališauskas, a Lithuanian Righteous Among the Nations
Marija Mališauskienė, a Lithuanian Righteous Among the Nations

Lithuanian-language surnames
Toponymic surnames